Ranby may refer to:

 Ranby, Lincolnshire
 Ranby, Nottinghamshire
 Ranby (surname)